Konstantinos Panagopoulos (born 23 September 1977) is a Greek football manager.

He became manager of Swedish club IF Karlstad Football in August 2020.

References

1977 births
Living people
Greek football managers
Panionios F.C. managers
Athlitiki Enosi Larissa F.C. managers
Aiolikos F.C. managers
Trikala F.C. managers
Apollon Smyrnis F.C. managers
Expatriate football managers in Sweden
Greek expatriate sportspeople in Sweden
Footballers from Piraeus